The Skrunda class is a class of SWATH patrol vessels used by the Latvian Navy. The main duties of the vessels include fisheries inspections, search and rescue, environmental protection, sovereignty enforcement, and participation in NATO and EU operations.

Description 

The Skrunda class was ordered in 2008 and built in cooperation by Abeking & Rasmussen Shipyard in Germany and Riga Shipyard in Latvia between 2009 and 2013. The class and the five vessels are named after towns and cities in Latvia from each of the five historical regions of Latvia, where important battles for Latvia's independence took place. The design is based on the well proven Abeking & Rasmussen  SWATH Pilot boat design, which is known for its excellent seaworthiness, offering motions in high sea state similar to conventional monohull ships three to four times its size. The propulsion system was designed specifically for the Skrunda class and places two MAN D 2842 diesel engines in the lower torpedo hulls, driving Servogear controllable pitch propellers via Servogear reduction gearboxes.

Tasked to monitor and control the Latvian and EU territorial waters and exclusive economic zone, the Skrunda class can perform a number of different missions by changing the mission module between the bows of the two hulls, which adheres to the dimensions of a  ISO container and has a payload of 6 tons.  A Mission Module may contain weapons systems, equipment for hydrographic surveying, environmental protection, support for divers, or mine countermeasure operations.

Armament 

The standard armament consists of two  machine guns. In addition, one Mission Module can be installed with a weapons system that weighs up to 6 tons.

Vessels in class

References

External links 
 Maritime Journal
 SWATH Skrunda P-05 testing in Germany

Patrol boat classes
Small waterplane area twin hull vessels
Military catamarans